Padma Venkataraman (born 1942) is an Indian social activist and the President of the Women's Indian Association.  She has focused on women’s welfare issues and rehabilitation of leprosy-affected persons.  She is the eldest daughter of former President of India R. Venkataraman.

Awards
She received the Avvaiyar Award from the Government of Tamil Nadu in 2017.

References 

1942 births
Living people
Indian women activists